is a former Japanese football player.

Club career
Yanagawa was born in Sanda on May 1, 1987. He joined J2 League club Vissel Kobe from youth team in 2006. In first season, he played many matches as center back and the club was promoted to J1 League. However he could hardly play in the match from 2007. He moved to Ventforet Kofu in 2010. Although he returned to Vissel in 2011, he had no opportunity to play and moved to Thespa Kusatsu in July 2011. From 2012, he played for Tochigi SC (2012) and Gainare Tottori (2013-14). In 2015, he moved to Philippines and joined Global with Vissel team mate Norio Suzuki. He moved to Voltes (later Marikina) in 2016. He left the club end of 2017 season.

National team career
In July 2007, Yanagawa was elected Japan U-20 national team for 2007 U-20 World Cup. At this tournament, he played 1 match as center back against Nigeria.

Club statistics

References

External links
 

1987 births
Living people
Association football people from Hyōgo Prefecture
Japanese footballers
Japan youth international footballers
J1 League players
J2 League players
J3 League players
Vissel Kobe players
Ventforet Kofu players
Thespakusatsu Gunma players
Tochigi SC players
Gainare Tottori players
Global Makati F.C. players
JPV Marikina F.C. players
Expatriate footballers in the Philippines
Association football defenders